Staphylinoidea is a superfamily of beetles. It is a very large and diverse group with worldwide distribution.

Description
Adult staphylinoids are generally small beetles no more than a few millimetres long, though Staphylinidae can reach 50 mm long and Silphidae can reach 45 mm. The superfamily includes the smallest beetles (and the smallest of all non-parasitic insects) in family Ptiliidae. Most Ptiliidae do not exceed 1 mm long as adults, while the smallest species is just 325 µm long.

Adults can be recognised by the hind wings having no accessory posterior ridge (locking device), no medial loop, no wedge cell and no apical hinge. The 8th segment of the abdomen is not entirely invaginated within the 7th. The head usually lacks a coronal suture (rarely with a short, rudimentary suture).

Larval staphylinoids have 3-segmented (rarely 4-segmented) maxillary palps with distinct (often fused) galia and lacinia. The body usually has well-developed tergites and sternites. The spiracles are annular or annular-biforous. There are no epistomal lobes.

Systematics and evolution
Staphylinoidea contains the following subgroups:
 Family Agyrtidae C.G. Thomson 1859 (primitive carrion beetles)
 Subfamily Agyrtinae Thomson, 1859
 Subfamily Necrophilinae Newton, 1997
 Subfamily Pterolomatinae Thomson, 1862
 Family Jacobsoniidae Heller, 1926
 Family Hydraenidae Mulsant 1844 (minute moss beetles)
 Subfamily Hydraeninae Mulsant, 1844
 Subfamily Ochthebiinae C. G. Thomson, 1860
 Subfamily Orchymontiinae Perkins, 1997
 Subfamily Prosthetopinae Perkins, 1994
 Family Leiodidae Fleming 1821 (round fungus beetles)
 Subfamily Camiarinae Jeannel, 1911
 Subfamily Catopocerinae Hatch, 1927
 Subfamily Cholevinae Kirby, 1837
 Subfamily Coloninae Horn, 1880
 Subfamily Leiodinae Fleming, 1821
 Subfamily Platypsyllinae Ritsema, 1869
 Family Ptiliidae Erichson 1845 (featherwing beetles)
 Subfamily Acrotrichinae Reitter, 1909
 Subfamily Cephaloplectinae Sharp, 1883
 Subfamily Nanosellinae Barber, 1924
 Subfamily Ptiliinae Erichson, 1845
 Family Silphidae Latreille 1807 (carrion beetles)
 Subfamily Nicrophorinae Kirby, 1837
 Subfamily Silphinae Latreille, 1806
 Family Staphylinidae Latreille 1802 (rove beetles)
 Subfamily Aleocharinae Fleming, 1821
 Subfamily Apateticinae Fauvel, 1895
 Subfamily Dasycerinae Reitter, 1887
 Subfamily Empelinae Newton and Thayer, 1992
 Subfamily Euaesthetinae Thomson, 1859
 Subfamily Glypholomatinae Jeannel, 1962
 Subfamily Habrocerinae Mulsant and Rey, 1876
 Subfamily Leptotyphlinae Fauvel, 1874
 Subfamily Megalopsidiinae Leng, 1920
 Subfamily Micropeplinae Leach, 1815
 Subfamily Microsilphinae Crowson, 1950
 Subfamily Neophoninae Fauvel, 1905
 Subfamily Olisthaerinae Thomson, 1858
 Subfamily Omaliinae MacLeay, 1825
 Subfamily Osoriinae Erichson, 1839
 Subfamily Oxyporinae Fleming, 1821
 Subfamily Oxytelinae Fleming, 1821
 Subfamily Paederinae Fleming, 1821
 Subfamily Phloeocharinae Erichson, 1839
 Subfamily Piestinae Erichson, 1839
 Subfamily Proteininae Erichson, 1839
 Subfamily Protopselaphinae Newton and Thayer, 1995
 Subfamily Pselaphinae Latreille, 1802
 Subfamily Pseudopsinae Ganglbauer, 1895
 Subfamily Scaphidiinae Latreille, 1806
 Subfamily Scydmaeninae Leach, 1815
 Subfamily Solieriinae Newton and Thayer, 1992
 Subfamily Staphylininae Latreille, 1802
 Subfamily Steninae MacLeay, 1825
 Subfamily Tachyporinae MacLeay, 1825
 Subfamily Trichophyinae Thomson, 1858
 Subfamily Trigonurinae Reiche, 1866
 † Subfamily Protactinae Heer, 1847

The unambiguous fossil record dates back to Triassic, and an early Mesozoic origin of the group is probable.

Phylogeny 
A 2019 molecular phylogenetic study confirmed the monophyly of Ptilidae and found that it is sister group to Hydraenidae.

References

 
Beetle superfamilies